Steven Culbertson (born September 23, 1957 in Bitburg, West Germany) has been president and Chief Executive Officer of Youth Service America, since May 16, 1996.

Biography

Born of American parents on Bitburg Air Force Base in Bitburg, Germany, Culbertson grew up in Camp Springs, Maryland and Amherst, Massachusetts.  He graduated from Amherst Regional High School in 1975 where he played soccer and squash, ran track, and was president of the Student Council.  He attended Hamilton College in Clinton, Oneida County, New York, and received B.A. degrees in English and French in 1979.  He began his career as Director of Communications for the Chi Psi Educational Trust in Ann Arbor, Michigan. Culbertson has been vice president for Development and College Relations at Connecticut College and Vice President for Marketing at Sumner Rahr & Company in Chicago, specializing in philanthropic support, communications, and strategic planning for nonprofits. Prior to YSA, he worked with the Environmental Defense Fund to organize the H. John Heinz III Center for Science, Economics, and the Environment.

In October 1996, Culbertson expanded YSA's outreach capacity by launching its first website YSA.org.  In 2000, he developed Global Youth Service Day, an international expansion of National Youth Service Day, YSA's signature program in the United States.  Dedicated to the contributions that young people make to their communities 365 days of the year, GYSD now takes place in more than 100 countries, and is the largest service event in the world.  In 2008, he led the launch of the Semester of Service , a service and learning strategy to encourage in-depth projects of "Intensity and Duration".  Projects often take place between Martin Luther King Day in January and Global Youth Service Day in April.  In 2016, Culbertson launched a new YSA initiative to engage the world's youth in taking action to meet the 17 new United Nations Sustainable Development Goals.

Culbertson has been an active volunteer in organizations including Rotary International, the Boy Scouts of America, the Episcopal Church, and the Lawrence Hall School. He was a Trustee for America's Promise, and has served on the boards of the Camp Fire (2010-2016), and Youth Service America (1996-present).  He also served as a judge for the Zayed Future Energy Prize.

Recognition
For two years in a row, The NonProfit Times named Culbertson to its list of "The 50 most powerful and influential leaders" in the sector, saying, "Culbertson has helped to position volunteering and young people as an issue and a national priority."

See also

Youth service
Service-Learning
Civic Engagement
Democracy
Learn and Serve America
AmeriCorps
National service
Youth Service America
National Youth Leadership Council
National Service Learning Conference

References

External links
 2016 Amazing Kids Magazine Interview
Youth Service America website
Global Youth Service Day website
Kellogg Foundation Profile website
Jim Lehrer NewsHour Interview website
Hamilton College website
Chi Psi Educational Trust website
Environmental Defense Fund website

1957 births
Living people
People from Bitburg
Hamilton College (New York) alumni
Chi Psi
American nonprofit executives
Youth empowerment people
Amherst Regional High School (Massachusetts) alumni